Andrew or Andy Taylor may refer to:

Sport 
 Andrew Taylor (footballer, born 1986), English footballer
 Andy Taylor (footballer, born 1986), English footballer
 Andy Taylor (footballer, born 1988), English footballer
 Andrew Taylor (Australian footballer) (born 1965), VFL/AFL player
 Andrew Taylor (baseball) (born 1986), baseball player
 Andrew Taylor (cricketer) (1838–1901), English cricketer
 Andrew Taylor (water polo) (born 1963), Australian former water polo player
 Andrew Taylor (sailor) (born 1963), New Zealand sailor
 Andrew Taylor (cyclist) (born 1985), Australian track cyclist

Arts and literature 
 Andrew Eldritch (born 1959), born Andrew William Harvey Taylor, singer of The Sisters of Mercy
 Andy Taylor (guitarist) (born 1961), former guitarist for Duran Duran
 Andy Taylor (music entrepreneur), manager of Iron Maiden and founder of Sanctuary Records
 Andrew Taylor (author) (born 1951), British crime novelist
 Andrew Taylor (poet) (born 1940), Australian poet
 Andrew Taylor (painter) (born 1967), Australian painter
 Andrew Taylor (architect) (1850–1937), British-Canadian architect and politician

Other 
 Andrew C. Taylor, American businessman, Chairman and CEO of Enterprise Rent-A-Car
 Andrew D. Taylor (born 1950), scientist
 Andrew Taylor (businessman) (born 1957), Chairman of Leicester City F.C.
 Andy Taylor (The Andy Griffith Show), a fictional television character
 Andrew Taylor, character in the 1926 film Aloma of the South Seas